Love is a 2012 Taiwanese-Chinese romance film directed and cowritten by Doze Niu. It stars Zhao Wei, Shu Qi, Mark Chao, Ethan Juan, Eddie Peng, Amber Kuo, Ivy Chen and Doze Niu.  Love premiered in the Panorama section of the 62nd Berlin International Film Festival. The film features an ensemble cast, with the stories revealed to be interwoven as the plot progresses.

Plot 
Love showcases the different types of relationships: family, friends, lovers, coworkers, and also those between strangers are shown to express the different types of love people have every day. Through the three subplots of eight interwoven characters, the ups and downs of love, what love has to offer and what love has to take, the film shows the relative situations in which love can take hold.

Subplot 1: Yi Jia, Xiao Min, and Ah Kai  
Yi Jia (Ivy Chen) is a simple, ordinary girl that goes along with everybody around her. She is in the Cycling Team of her university, and plays the supportive role called the domestique. Her real life is similar to that of her role on the cycling team: she has no characteristic, no special talents and is not very outstanding in general. When she is with her best friend—Xiao Min—she also assumes a supportive role, just like on the cycling team.  Xiao Min (Amber Kuo) is best friends with Yi Jia, and yet is the complete opposite of Yi Jia. Xiao Min is assertive, talented, confident, has a good family background, and has everybody's attention. She also has a boyfriend, Ah Kai. Ah Kai (Eddie Peng) is interested in filming and dreams to be a successful director in the future, but his dream is often tossed around as a joke by people he knows, with the exception of Xiao Min. 
These three best friends complement each other, forming a strong friendship, but all this comes to a halt when Yi Jia finds herself pregnant.

Subplot 2: Mark, Xiao Ye  
Mark (Mark Chao) is a young and successful entrepreneur. He is self-indulgent, cool, modern and casual. His motif about woman is, "As long as it is worth it to conquer" and has an attitude represented with the phrase, "If you never have to do it, then you never miss it". On a trip to Beijing, Mark meets Xiao Ye. Xiao Ye (Zhao Wei) is a single mother with a seven-year-old son, Dou Dou, and is Mark's realty estate agent. Their meeting, however, did not go well, as it ended in the police office with Xiao Ye suffering a broken leg and having her son become lost along the way. Eventually, with the help of Mark, Dou Dou is found. Through this experience, and his time with the mother and son, Mark finds himself developing intimate feelings that he never had with people before.

Subplot 3: Xiao Kuan, Rou Yi, Chao Ping  
Xiao Kuan (Ethan Juan) has a simple, pure, boy-next-door personality. Rou Yi (Shu Qi) is a materialistic woman, dependent on rich men, and mistress of Chao Ping, which leads to her life in the limelight. Chao Ping (Doze Niu) is an aging man, and CEO of a well-known company. After an unhappy night of partying, Rou Yi and Chao Ping argue on the way home. Rou Yi gets out of the car, continuing the argument, which is rapidly growing more heated, and the ensuing fight is witnessed by Xiao Kuan. In a moment of heroism, Xiao Kuan grabs Rou Yi, running away from Chao Ping and brings her back to his house, which is quiet and serene. From then on, they became acquaintances, and Xiao Kuan's place serves a place of escape for Rou Yi - a place away from the lights and attention. Through Xiao Kuan's simple life, Rou Yi contemplates her life and eventually comes to the conclusion that it is time to change and take control.

Cast
Shu Qi as Rou Yi
Ethan Juan as Xiao Kuan
Ivy Chen as Yi Jia
Mark Chao as Mark
Amber Kuo as Xiao Min
Eddie Peng as Ah Kai
Zhao Wei as Xiao Ye
Doze Niu as Chao Ping
Yu Mei-ren as Mrs. Li
Lung Shao-hua as Mr. Li
Yang Kuei-mei as Mark's mother

Cameo appearance
Ralf Chiu as Mark's assistant 
Rhydian Vaughan as Xiao Kuan's colleague 
Frankie Huang as Xiao Kuan's colleague 
Emerson Tsai as Xiao Kuan's colleague 
Chen Han-dian as Xiao Kuan's colleague
Pu Hsueh-liang as Wedding host
Kang Kang as Cycling coach

Soundtrack

Box office
In Taiwan, the film grossed more than NT$160 million.

Awards and nominations

References

External links

 Love (2012) Official Website

2012 films
2012 romantic comedy-drama films
Chinese romantic comedy-drama films
Taiwanese-language films
Taiwanese romantic comedy-drama films
Warner Bros. films
Huayi Brothers films
Films directed by Doze Niu
2012 drama films
2010s Mandarin-language films